Tom Scheffler (born October 27, 1954) is an American former professional basketball player.

Career
Born in St. Joseph, Michigan, Scheffler played collegiately at Purdue University before spending most of his career in Europe playing in Italy, Spain, Greece, Switzerland, and France.  His only stint in the NBA was in the 1984–85 season when he played 39 games as a 12th man for Portland.

Scheffler's most notable successes came during his time with ÉB Pau-Orthez in France where his contribution resulted in Orthez winning the French basketball Championship in 1986 and 1987.

Scheffler's younger brother, Steve Scheffler, also starred at Purdue University and played for the Seattle SuperSonics.

Post career
In his post-career days, Scheffler settled in Lugano, Switzerland where he runs an English school.

References

External links
 Pau Orthez career (French)

1954 births
Living people
American expatriate basketball people in France
American expatriate basketball people in Greece
American expatriate basketball people in Italy
American expatriate basketball people in Spain
American expatriate basketball people in Switzerland
Aris B.C. players
Basketball players from Michigan
CB Gran Canaria players
Centers (basketball)
Élan Béarnais players
Indiana Pacers draft picks
Juvecaserta Basket players
Le Mans Sarthe Basket players
Liga ACB players
Lugano Tigers players
Pallacanestro Treviso players
People from St. Joseph, Michigan
Portland Trail Blazers players
Purdue Boilermakers men's basketball players
Victoria Libertas Pallacanestro players
American men's basketball players